Janusz Gaudyn (25 February 1935 in Katowice-Ochojec – 22 June 1984 in Trzyniec) was a Polish physician, writer and poet. He is known mostly for his aphorisms.

Gaudyn lived since 1939 in the Zaolzie region and spent his youth in Frysztat. He graduated from the Juliusz Słowacki Polish Gymnasium in Orłowa and later from medical studies at the Palacký University in Olomouc. He worked as an internist in the hospital in Český Těšín and later as a general practitioner in Trzycież, he lived in Trzyniec. Gaudyn was a member of the Polish Cultural and Educational Union and several literary organizations.

Works
 Fraszki i fraszeczki (1967)
 Zdania (1969)
 Duet (1969) (together with Gabriel Palowski)
 List (1980)
 My (1980)
 Z tej ziemi : 129 fraszek o miłości  (1983)

References

Further reading 
 

1935 births
1984 deaths
People from Katowice
Polish general practitioners
Polish people from Zaolzie
Palacký University Olomouc alumni
20th-century Polish poets
20th-century Polish male writers